The 1972 Florida Gators football team represented the University of Florida during the 1972 NCAA University Division football season. The season was the third for Doug Dickey as the head coach of the Florida Gators football team.  Dickey's 1972 Florida Gators finished with a 5–5–1 overall record and a 3–3–1 Southeastern Conference (SEC) record, tying for sixth among ten SEC teams.

Schedule

Primary source: 2015 Florida Gators Football Media Guide

Attendance figures: 1973 University of Florida Football Brochure.

Season summary

SMU

Mississippi State

Florida State

Alabama

Ole Miss

Auburn

Georgia

Passing: Bowden 7/14, 144 Yds, Rushing: Moore 17/64, Receiving: Jackson 3/71

Kentucky

LSU

A massive rainstorm inundated Florida Field during the game, allowing a 4–4 Florida team to hang close enough with No. 8 LSU to tie the game at 3 with 2:08 left. LSU missed seven field goals during the deluge. The front page of the Youngstown Vindicator reported the next day that during the pre-game invocation, Catholic priest Michael Gannon prayed, "And if it be Thy will, we'd like You to stop the rain." It immediately started raining harder and continued heavily throughout the game

Miami (FL)

North Carolina

References

Florida
Florida Gators football seasons
Florida Gators football